Soroush Sehhat (born  in Isfahan) is an Iranian director, screenwriter and actor. He has directed number of Iranian TV series such as Char Khooneh and Iranian Dinner.

Selected filmography

Acting
 Cold Fever (TV series), 2004
 Ekbatan, 2012
Bending the Rules, 2013
Toward Freedom, 2014
 Once Upon a Time in Iran, 2021

Directing
 Char Khooneh, 2007
 Sakhtemane Pezeshkan, 2011
 Pejman,2013
 Bachelors, 2016 - 2018
 Dance with Me, 2019

Writer 
 Under the City's Skin (TV series), 2001
 Without Description TV series, 2002

References

External links

 

Living people
1965 births
Islamic Azad University alumni
Iranian male television actors
Iranian television presenters
University of Isfahan alumni
Iranian television directors
Iranian stand-up comedians
Iranian male film actors
Male actors from Tehran
Iranian film directors
Iranian screenwriters
Iranian male writers
Actors from Isfahan
Iranian directors
Iranian comedians